Peter Nenzén (born 14 December 1960) is a Swedish curler.

Teams

References

External links
 

1960 births
Swedish male curlers
Living people
20th-century Swedish people